The United Arab Emirates does not have any permanent rivers, but does have wadis, a permanently or intermittently dry riverbed. This is a list of wadis in United Arab Emirates arranged by drainage basin.

Persian Gulf
Dubai Creek is sometimes called a river, but is a saltwater inlet in Dubai
Wadi Bih / Wādī Al-Bayḥ / Wādī al Bīḩ, in Ras Al Khaimah, Dibba and Oman
Wadi Ghalilah / Wādī Ghalīlah, in Ras Al Khaimah
Wadi Naqab / Wādī Naqab, in Ras Al Khaimah
Wadi Rahabah / Wādī Raḩbah, in Ras Al Khaimah
Wadi Shaam / Wādī ash Sha‘m, in Ras Al Khaimah

Gulf of Oman
Wadi Abadilah in Fujairah
Wadi Ham in Fujairah
Wadi Hatta / Wādī Ḩattā, in Dubai and Oman
Wadi Hayl in Fujairah
Wadi Helo in Sharjah
Wadi Qor / Wādī al Qūr, in Ras Al Khaiman
Wadi Saham in Fujairah
Wadi Shawka in Ras Al Khaimah
Wadi Shis in Sharjah
Wadi Siji / Wādī Sījī, in Fujairah and Ras Al Khaimah
Wadi Wurayah / Wādī Wurayyah, in Fujairah
Wadi Zikt / Wādī Zikt, in Fujairah

Interior
 Wadi Arar / Wadi Ar'ar, (tributary of Wādī ‘Asimah), in Fujairah and Ras Al Khaimah 
 Wadi Arus / Wādī ‘Arūs, (tributary of Wādī Shāh), in Ras Al Khaimah
Wadi Asimah / Wādī ‘Asimah (tributary of Wādī Sidr), in Ras Al Khaimah
 Wadi Barut / Wādī Barut (tributary of Wadi Ghalilah), in Ras Al Khaimah
Wadi Ejili in Ras Al Khaimah
Wadi Esfai in Ras Al Khaimah
Wadi Fara / Wādī al Fara‘, in Ras Al Khaimah
 Wadi Halhal / Wādī Ḩalḩal (tributary of Wadi Ghalilah),in Ras Al Khaimah
 Wadi Halu / Wādī Halū (tributary of Wadi Naqab), in Ras Al Khaimah 
 Wadi Jib / Wādī Jib (tributary of Wadi Shah), in Ras Al Khaimah
 Wadi Khabb / Wādī Khabb (tributary of Wadi Ghalilah), in Ras Al Khaimah
 Wadi Litibah / Wādī Litibah (tributary of Wadi Ghalilah), in Ras Al Khaimah
 Wadi Madnan / Wādī Madnan (tributary of Wadi Naqab), in Ras Al Khaimah 
Wadi Maydaq / Wādī Maydaq, in Fujairah 
Wadi Wadi Muhayli / Wādī Muhaylī (tributary of Wadi Naqab), in Ras Al Khaimah 
Wadi Modaynah in Ras Al Khaimah
Wadi Samarat (tributary of Wādī Madnan), in Ras Al Khaimah
 Wadi Shah / Wādī Shāh (tributary of Wadi Bih), in Ras Al Khaimah 
 Wadi Shisah / Wādī Shīşah (tributary of Wādī Shāh), in Ras Al Khaimah 
Wadi Sal in Ras Al Khaimah
Wadi Sidr / Wādī Sidr in Fujairah 
Wadi Shie / Wādī Shī in Khor Fakkan, Sharjah 
Wadi Tarabat / Wādī Tarabat near Al Ain in Abu Dhabi,
Wadi Tayyibah in Fujairah
Wadi Tuwa in Ras Al Khaimah

See also
 List of countries without rivers

References

United Arab Emirates
Lists of landforms of the United Arab Emirates